The Sergeyev Collection is a collection of choreographic notation, musical materials, designs for décor and costumes, theatre programs, photos and other items that document the repertory of the Imperial Ballet (precursor of the Kirov/Mariinsky Ballet) of St. Petersburg, Russia at the turn of the 20th century. The majority of the choreographic notations document with varying degrees of detail the original works and revivals of the renowned choreographer Marius Petipa, who served as Premier Maître de ballet of the St. Petersburg Imperial Theatres. The collection also documents a few ballets by Lev Ivanov, who served as second Maître de ballet. Also included in the collection are choreographic notation documenting dances from various operas by both Petipa and Ivanov, respectively.

The Sergeyev Collection is named after Nicholas Sergeyev,  of the St. Petersburg Imperial Theatres from 1903 to 1918, who brought the collection out of Russia after the Russian Revolution of 1917. Today, the Sergeyev Collection is housed in the Harvard Theatre Collection at Houghton Library, where it has been since 1969.

History of the collection 

At the end of the nineteenth century, the dancer Vladimir Stepanov developed his own method of documenting choreography, which he later detailed in his book L'Alphabet des Mouvements du Corps Humain. In 1893 Stepanov proposed a project to the ruling committee of the Imperial Ballet of St. Petersburg and its school, the Imperial Ballet School, that would record the company's repertory for posterity. The committee, which made decisions on the appointment of dancers, repertory, etc., consisted of Marius Petipa (Premier Maître de ballet of the St. Petersburg Imperial Theatres); Lev Ivanov (second Maître de Ballet); Ekaterina Vazem (former Prima ballerina of the Imperial Theatres and teacher of the classe de perfection); Pavel Gerdt (Premier danseur of the Imperial Theatres); and Christian Johansson (former Premier danseur of the Imperial Theatres and teacher at the school). The committee required that Stepanov first present demonstrations, known as "certifications", on the effectiveness of his new method before the project would be fully implemented with state funding.

The first of these demonstrations was the notation of the one-act ballet La Flûte magique, a work originally produced in 1893 by Lev Ivanov and the composer Riccardo Drigo for the students of the Imperial Ballet School. Stepanov then presented a second demonstration of his method by mounting a reconstruction of Jules Perrot's one-act ballet Le Rêve du peintre, originally staged in 1848 to the music of Cesare Pugni. The notations for this work were created by Stepanov after consulting Christian Johansson, who participated in the 1848 production and many performances thereafter. Based on the success of these notations, Stepanov's project was approved and he soon began to notate the repertory of the Imperial Ballet. Among the first pieces to be documented was Petipa's 1894 ballet Le Réveil de Flore and the scene Le jardin animé from the ballet Le Corsaire. Stepanov's method of notation was also included for a time as part of the curriculum of students of the Imperial Ballet School.

After Stepanov's death in 1896, the dancer Alexander Gorsky took over the notation project and perfected Stepanov's system. After Gorsky departed St. Petersburg in 1900 to take up the post of Ballet Master to the Bolshoi Theatre of Moscow, the former dancer of the Imperial Theatres Nicholas Sergeyev took over the project as supervisor. By 1903 Sergeyev was appointed régisseur of the Imperial Ballet. It was Sergeyev's assistants who were the scribes that wrote down the majority of the notations that make up the Sergeyev Collection, all of whom were dancers with the Imperial Ballet: Alexander Chekrygin (ru: Чекрыгин, Александр Иванович, Victor Rakhmanov, Nikolay Kremnev (ru: Николай Кремнев), and S. Ponomaryev (ru: С. Пономарев). The notations were created during rehearsals, and include the names of the dancers who were performing in the lead roles.

After the Russian Revolution of 1917, Nicholas Sergeyev left Russia with the notated choreographies as well as a great deal of music and other materials relating to the works that were documented. In 1920 he was invited by Sergei Diaghilev to stage the Petipa/Tchaikovsky The Sleeping Beauty from the notations for the Ballets Russes in Paris, but Diaghilev's insistence on altering passages of Petipa's choreography caused Sergeyev to withdraw his services.

In 1921 Sergeyev took over the post of régisseur to the ballet troupe of the Latvian National Opera in Riga, and during his appointment with the company he added more music belonging to the notated ballets. Piano scores and orchestral parts for some of the ballets was also added, such as Paquita by Édouard Deldevez, The Little Humpbacked Horse by Cesare Pugni,  and Adolphe Adam's scores for Giselle and Le Corsaire among many others.

Sergeyev utilized the notation to mount Petipa's definitive version of Giselle for the Paris Opera Ballet in 1924, with the ballerina Olga Spessivtseva in the title role and Anton Dolin as Albrecht. This was not only the first time the Parisian ballet had danced Giselle since the 1860s, but also the first production outside of Russia to include the Imperial Ballet's choreographic text as preserved under Petipa, which is now the traditional edition that most ballet companies have always used as a basis for their own productions. The choreographic notation of Giselle documents when Petipa himself took Anna Pavlova through rehearsals in about 1903.

With the aid of the notations, Sergeyev made what is perhaps his most substantial contribution to the art of ballet: at the invitation of Ninette de Valois, he staged Petipa's The Sleeping Beauty, Giselle, The Nutcracker and the Petipa/Cecchetti Coppélia for the Vic-Wells Ballet of London, the precursor of the Royal Ballet, who still perform these ballets. In 1942 Sergeyev began staging more ballets for the International Ballet, a British touring company founded in 1941 by the ballerina Mona Inglesby, who offered to stage the productions as close as possible to Petipa's imperial stagings. When in 1946 the Sadler's Wells Ballet staged a new edited Sleeping Beauty  to reopen the Royal Opera House, Sergeyev left to join Inglesby, remaining balletmaster with International Ballet until his death in 1951. His stagings for both British companies formed the nucleus of what is now known loosely as the "classical ballet repertory", and as a result these works went on to be staged all over the world in versions largely derived from the Vic-Wells Ballet's own productions.

When Sergeyev died in Nice, France on 23 June 1951 the notations passed on for a brief time to a Russian associate of his, from whom Mona Inglesby purchased them, continuing to stage his productions with the International Ballet until its closure in 1953. Inglesby, through the London theatrical dealer Ifan Kyrle Fletcher, sold the notations of Swan Lake to Harvard University in 1967, followed by the rest of the notations in 1969, for a sum claimed to be around £6,000. Today the collection is known officially as the Nikolai Sergeev Dance Notations and Music Scores for Ballets, though it is commonly referred to simply as The Sergeyev Collection. For some time the notations were useless, as no one in the world had any knowledge of how to read Stepanov's method. It was not until Stepanov's original primer was found in the archives of the Mariinsky Theatre that the notations were able to be deciphered.

Not all of the notations are complete, with some being rather vague in sections, leading some historians who have studied the collection to theorize that they were made to function simply as "aides-mémoires" for the Ballet Master, répétiteur, or régisseur already familiar with these works. Aside from the choreographic notations, the collection includes photos, set and costume designs and music for many of the ballets in their performance editions (mostly in piano and/or violin reduction), many of which include a substantial number of dances, variations, etc. interpolated from other works. One example of this is the music and notations for the ballet Le Corsaire, which contain additional dances and variations from other works. One finds that the notation and score contains pieces from Petipa's ballets La Vestale (1888), Satanella (1848), Les Aventures de Pélée (1876), Pygmalion, ou La statue de Chypre (1883), Trilby (1870), and Cinderella (1893).

Noted use of the collection in modern times

In 1984 the historians Peter Wright and the musicologist/professor Roland John Wiley staged an adaptation of the original 1892 choreography for The Nutcracker for the Royal Ballet.
In 1999, Sergei Vikharev used the notation to stage a new production of The Sleeping Beauty for the Mariinsky Ballet. The original décor and costumes were restored from the designs of 1890.
In 2000, the choreographer Pierre Lacotte created a new version of Petipa's ballet The Pharaoh's Daughter for the Bolshoi Ballet. Lacotte called upon the Stepanov notation expert Doug Fullington to reconstruct the so-called "River Variations" from the ballet's under-water scene and a few other pieces. In the end, Lacotte re-choreographed nearly all of the ballet himself "in the style of the epoch", and retained only a few pieces of reconstructed choreography from the ballet's second act.
In 2001, Sergei Vikharev used the notation to stage a new version of La Bayadère for the Mariinsky Ballet, which included the long-lost final act. The décor and costumes were restored from designs created for Marius Petipa's last revival of the ballet in 1900.
In 2001, Sergei Vikharev used the notation to stage a reconstruction of the Petipa/Cecchetti Coppélia for the Novosibirsk Opera and Ballet Theatre. In 2008, Vikharev staged this version for the Bolshoi Ballet with décor and costumes based on the Imperial Ballet's production of the late 19th century.
In 2004, with the assistance of Manard Stewart, Doug Fullington staged a reconstruction of Petipa's original choreography for the scene Le Jardin animé from the ballet Le Corsaire for the Pacific Northwest Ballet School's annual recital at the Seattle Opera House.
In 2004, Yuri Burlaka used the notation for a workshop at the Bolshoi Ballet Academy to reconstruct La Roseraie pas de quatre created by Nikolai Legat circa 1914 that is based on Petipa's Le Réveil de Flore and includes variations from other Petipa ballets.
In 2006, Doug Fullington reconstructed twenty-five of Petipa's dances from the ballet Le Corsaire for a new production by the Bayerisches Staatsballett.
In 2007 Alexei Ratmansky and Yuri Burlaka made use of the notations of Le Corsaire for their revival of the ballet for the Bolshoi Ballet, which premiered in 2007 to great acclaim.
In 2007, the Pacific Northwest Ballet presented a lecture-demonstration using the Sergeyev Collection. Doug Fullington reconstructed various dances from the notations which were performed with examples of George Balanchine's choreography in order to demonstrate Petipa's influence on the work of Balanchine.
In 2007, Sergei Vikharev used the notation to stage a reconstruction of Petipa's original production of Le Réveil de Flore for the Mariinsky Ballet, including the décor and costumes of 1894. 
 In 2008, Yuri Burlaka used the notation to stage Petipa's Grand Pas classique, Pas de trois and Mazurka des enfants from Paquita for the Bolshoi Ballet.
In 2009, Yuri Burlaka and Vassily Medvedev used the notation to stage a revival of Petipa's version of Jules Perrot's La Esmeralda for the Bolshoi Ballet. The production featured décor and costumes from designs made for the Imperial Ballet's production of 1899.
In 2011 Sergei Vikharev used the notation to stage a reconstruction of Raymonda for the Teatro alla Scala. The production featured décor and costumes from designs made for the original production of 1898.
In June 2011, Doug Fullington utilized the notation to stage a reconstruction of Giselle for the Pacific Northwest Ballet.
In 2012, Doug Fullington used the notation to present the program After Petipa for Works and Process at the Guggenheim. The program featured reconstructions of passages from Swan Lake and The Sleeping Beauty.
In 2013, Doug Fullington and Marian Smith used the notation to present the program Giselle Revisited for Works and Process at the Guggenheim.
In 2013 Vassily Medvedev and Yuri Burlaka used the notation to stage a revival of The Nutcracker for the Bayerisches Staatsballett. The décor and costumes were created from the original designs of the original production of 1892.
In 2014, Doug Fullington used the notation to present the program Petipa Exotique for Works and Process at the Guggenheim.  The program featured reconstructions of passages from La Bayadère, Le Corsaire and Le Roi Candaule.
In 2014 Doug Fullington and Alexei Ratmansky used the notation to stage a reconstruction of Paquita for the Bayerisches Staatsballett.
In 2015, Sergei Vikharev used the notation to stage a new production of La fille mal gardée for the Ural Opera Ballet Theatre in Ekaterinburg.
In 2015, Doug Fullington and Alexei Ratmansky staged a reconstruction of Marius Petipa's choreography for The Sleeping Beauty in a joint project between American Ballet Theatre and the Teatro alla Scala. The production featured décor and costumes based on the designs by Léon Bakst for the Ballets Russes production.
In 2016, Doug Fullington used the notation for the program Commedia dell'arte Explored for Works and Process at the Guggenheim. The program featured reconstructions of passages from Petipa's Les Millions d'Arléquin.
In 2016 Alexei Ratmansky staged a reconstruction of the Petipa/Ivanov Swan Lake for the Zürich Ballet.
In 2018, Alexei Ratmansky used the notation to stage a reconstruction of Petipa's Les Millions d'Arléquin as Harlequinade for American Ballet Theatre. The production was later staged by the Australian Ballet in 2022. The production featured décor and costumes from designs made for the Imperial Ballet's production of 1900.
In 2021, the ballet master and choreographer Stanislav Belyaevsky staged a reconstruction of Petipa's ballet Les Ruses d'amour as The Trial of Damis. The ballet was performed in its original venue, the Theatre of the Hermitage Museum.

Works documented in the collection 

 Paquita Petipa, after Mazilier (music: Deldevez) – 3 acts
 Giselle Petipa, after Coralli and Perrot (music: Adam) – 2 acts
 The Sleeping Beauty Petipa (music: Tchaikovsky) – Prologue and 3 acts
 The Nutcracker Ivanov?; Petipa? (music: Tchaikovsky) – 2 acts/3 tableaux
 Le Réveil de Flore Petipa (music: Drigo) – 1 act
 La Fille mal gardée Petipa and Ivanov, after Taglioni (music: Hertel) – 3 acts/4 tableaux
 Swan Lake Petipa & Ivanov, after Reisinger (music: Tchaikovsky; rev. Drigo) – 3 acts/4 tableaux
 Coppélia Petipa & Cecchetti, after Saint-Léon (music: Delibes) – 2 acts
 Les Caprices du Papillon Petipa (music: Krotkov) – 1 Act
 The Little Humpbacked Horse Petipa (1895) and Gorsky (1912), after Saint-Léon (music: Pugni) – 4 acts/10 tableaux
 Le Halte de Cavalerie Petipa (music: Armshiemer) – 1 Act
 Raymonda Petipa (music: Glazunov) – 3 acts/4 tableaux
 La Esmeralda Petipa, after Perrot (music: Pugni) – 3 acts/5 tableaux
 The Pharaoh's Daughter Petipa (music: Pugni) – 4 acts/7 tableaux
 Le Corsaire Petipa, after Mazilier (music: Adam, etc.) – 3 acts/5 tableaux
 Les Millions d'Arlequin (a.k.a. Harlequinade) Petipa (music: Drigo) – 2 acts
 Les Ruses d'Amour Petipa (music: Glazunov) – 1 act
 The Pupils of Dupré Petipa (music: Vizentini) – 2 acts (abridgement of Petipa's 1886 ballet L'Ordre du Roi)
 La Bayadère Petipa (music: Minkus) – 4 acts 
 Le Roi Candaule Petipa (music: Pugni) – 4 acts/6 tableaux
 La Forêt enchantée Ivanov and Petipa (music: Drigo) – 1 act
 La Flûte magique Ivanov (music: Drigo) – 1 act
 The Fairy Doll Nikolai Legat and Sergei Legat (music: Bayer, etc.) – 1 act/2 tableaux
 Songe du Rajah (1930 - Nicholas Sergeyev's version of the scene The Kingdom of the Shades from Petipa's La Bayadère)
 Small Balletic Pieces - numerous items from various ballets.
 Ballet sections from 24 operas

References 

Fullington, Doug. Petipa's Le Jardin Animé Restored. The Dancing Times: September, 2004. Vol. 94, No. 1129.
Fullington, Doug: The River Variations in Petipa's La Fille du Pharaon. The Dancing Times: December, 2000, Vol. 91, No. 1083.
Wiley, Roland John. Dances from Russia: An Introduction to the Sergeyev Collection Published in The Harvard Library Bulletin, 24.1 January 1976.

External links 
 Nikolai Sergeev Dance Notations and Music Scores for Ballets, 1888-1944 (MS Thr 245) Harvard Theatre Collection, Houghton Library, Harvard University.
 Nikolai Sergeev choreographic and music scores for the ballet Swan Lake, 1905-1924 (MS Thr 186) Harvard Theatre Collection, Houghton Library, Harvard University.
 Discussion with Sergei Vikharev
 Mona Inglesby obituary in The Daily Telegraph
 1946 Sleeping Beauty in Royal Ballet performance database

Dance notation
Harvard University